Ivan Oransky is the co-founder of Retraction Watch, a blog reporting scientific retractions, and a writer in residence at New York University's Arthur Carter Journalism Institute. Oransky graduated from New York University with a medical degree and was formally the editorial director of MedPage Today.

Publications  
https://www.science.org/content/article/meet-data-thugs-out-expose-shoddy-and-questionable-research

See also  
Retraction Watch

References  

Living people
Year of birth missing (living people)
New York University alumni
21st-century American journalists